United Nations Security Council Resolution 103, adopted on December 3, 1953, recommended to the General Assembly that San Marino be allowed to become a party to the Stature of the International Court of Justice if they met the following conditions; (a) acceptance of the provision of the Statute of the ICJ, (b) acceptance of all the obligations of a Member of the United Nations under Article 94 of the Charter and (c) undertaking to contribute to the expenses of the Court as the GA shall access from time to time, after consultation with the San Marinan Government.

The resolution was adopted with ten votes, while the Soviet Union abstained.

See also
List of United Nations Security Council Resolutions 101 to 200 (1953–1965)

References
Text of the Resolution at undocs.org

External links
 

 0103
 0103
 0103
1953 in San Marino
December 1953 events